Everybody's Dancin' is a 1950 American musical film.

It was originally known as Western Varieties.

The film was shot at Nassour Studios and was made by Spade Cooley's own company and released by Robert L. Lippert. Cooley had recently made Square Dance Jubilee for Lippert.

Plot

Cast
Spade Cooley as John Martin/Spade Cooley, previously known as Donald Martin
Dick Lane as "Colonel" Ed Harrison
Barbara Woodell as "Mama" Mary Berne
Ginny Jackson as Ginny Johnson
Hal Derwin as Bill
James Millican as "Papa" Steve Berne
Lyle Talbot as Contractor
Michael Whalen as Mr. Landon
Sid Melton as Agent
Tex Cromer as Tex Cromer

References

External links

1950 films
American musical comedy films
1950 musical comedy films
Lippert Pictures films
Films directed by Will Jason
Films scored by Albert Glasser
American black-and-white films
1950s English-language films
1950s American films